Azagu is a 1984 Indian Tamil-language film directed by K. Vijayan for A.Sundaram's Seshasayee Films. The film stars Sarath Babu and Sumathi.

Cast 
Sarath Babu
Sumathi
Savitri

Soundtrack 
Soundtrack was composed by G. K. Venkatesh.

"Devi Vandaal" - SPB, S. Janaki
"Mounamulla Mayakkam" - P. Jayachandran, S. Janaki
"Azhagenum" - P. Susheela

References

1984 films
1980s Tamil-language films
Films scored by G. K. Venkatesh
Films directed by K. Vijayan